This is a list of compositions by American composer William Bolcom.

By genre

Operas
 McTeague (1991–92)
 A View from the Bridge (1997–98)
 A Wedding (2003)
 Dinner at Eight (2016)

Symphonies 

 Symphony No. 1 (1957)
 Symphony No. 2 Oracles (1964)
 Symphony No. 3 Symphony for Chamber Orchestra (1979)
 Symphony No. 4 (1986)
 Symphony No. 5 (1989)
 Symphony No. 6 (1996–1997)
 Symphony No. 7 (2002)
 Symphony No. 8 (2005)
 Symphony No. 9 (2012)
 Symphony No. 1 for band (2008)

Concertos 

 Piano Concerto (1976)
 Violin Concerto in D (1983)
 Fantasia Concertante (1984)
 Clarinet Concerto (1988)
 Flute Concerto Lyric Concerto (1992–1993)
 Concerto for Two Pianos Left Hand Gaea (1996)
 Concerto Grosso for Saxophone Quartet and Orchestra (2000)
 Romanza (2009)
 Trombone Concerto (2016)
 Concerto for Soprano Saxophone and Band (2016)

Piano 

 Miscellaneous rags (24)
 Three Ghost Rags (1970)
 Graceful Ghost Rag
 Poltergeist Rag
 Dream Shadows Rag
 The Garden of Eden (1974)
 Twelve Etudes (1959–66)
 Twelve New Etudes for Piano (1977–1986)
 Nine Bagatelles (1996)
 Nine New Bagatelles (2005)
 Bird Spirits (1999)
 Dream Music No. 1 (1965)
 Fantasy-Sonata (1961)
 Ballade (2008)
Organ
 Mysteries (1976), commissioned for the 1976 International Contemporary Organ Music Festival, premiered by William Albright.

Song cycles 
 Songs of Innocence and of Experience
 Ancient Cabaret
 Briefly It Enters
 Cabaret Songs
 I Will Breathe a Mountain
 Let Evening Come
 Minicabs
 Old Addresses
 Open House
 Songs To Dance
 Three Donald Hall Songs
 A Whitman Triptych
 Morning and Evening Poems
 Medusa
 Laura Sonnets
 Chestnuts

Novelty songs
 "Lime Jello Marshmallow Cottage Cheese Surprise"

Guitar 

 Seasons

By year 

 1957:       First Symphony
 1964:       Symphony No. 2 "Oracles"
 1967:       Black Host (Nonesuch H-71260)
 1970: Graceful Ghost Rag
 1971:       Commedia (for "Almost" 18th Century Orchestra)
 1974:       The Garden of Eden
 1979:       Third Symphony (for Chamber Orchestra)
 1956-82: Songs of Innocence and of Experience (William Blake)
 1978-83:    "Cabaret Songs" (Vol. 1 and 2)
 1979-1984: Gospel Preludes (Books 1-4), for organ
 Book IV: Sometimes I Feel Like A Motherless Child (a reaction to Marvin Gaye's death), Sweet Hour of Prayer, and Fantasy on "O Zion Haste" and "The Church's One Foundation"
 1984:       Lilith for Alto Saxophone and Piano
 1977-85: Cabaret Songs (Vol. 1 and 2)
 1984:       Songs of Innocence and of Experience
 1985:       Fantasia Concertante, for viola, cello and orchestra
 1986:       Fourth Symphony
 1977-86:    Twelve New Etudes for Piano [Winner of 1988 Pulitzer Prize in Music]
 1989:       Fifth Symphony
 1991-92:  McTeague (opera)
 1996:     Cabaret Songs (Vol. 3 and 4)
 1996:     Gaea, Concerto for Two Left-Handed Pianists, and Orchestra
 1996-97:    Sixth Symphony
 1997-98:  A View from the Bridge (opera)
 1998:       Concert Suite (for alto saxophone and band)
 2000:       (First) Piano Quintet
 2002:       Seventh Symphony:  A Symphonic Concerto
 2003:       A Wedding (opera)
 2005:       La fantome du Clavecin (for harpsichord)
 2006:       Canciones de Lorca
 2007:       Eighth Symphony
 2007:       Lucrezia
 2008:       First Symphony for Band
 2009:       Prometheus
 2009:       Romanza (for solo violin and string orchestra)
 2011:       Ninth Symphony
 2016:      Dinner at Eight (opera)
2019:      Three Miniatures, premiered by the 2020 Eastern Michigan University Honors Band.

References

Bolcom, William